Francis I (23 August 1517 – 12 June 1545) was Duke of Lorraine from 1544–1545.

History
Born in Nancy, Francis was the eldest son of Antoine, Duke of Lorraine and Renée de Bourbon, daughter of Gilbert de Bourbon, Count of Montpensier.  He was briefly engaged in the mid-1530s to Anne of Cleves, who in 1540 would become the fourth wife of King Henry VIII of England. Their betrothal would be used by Henry to break his marriage to Anne after six short months.

On 10 July 1541, Francis married Princess Christina of Denmark in Brussels. Princess Christina was a daughter of King Christian II and Isabella of Austria (who had herself been a potential bride of Henry VIII). Francis died at Remiremont in 1545, leaving Christina as the Regent of Lorraine and as the guardian of their young children.

Children
By Christina of Denmark (c.1521 – 1590; married in 1541)

Ancestry

References

Sources

See also

 Dukes of Lorraine family tree
 List of rulers of Lorraine

|-

1517 births
1545 deaths
Nobility from Nancy, France
Hereditary Princes of Lorraine
Dukes of Lorraine
Dukes of Bar
Marquesses of Pont-à-Mousson